is Mika Nakashima's 14th single. This song is a lyrical and heartwarming love song about lovers parting in springtime. Mika uses her extraordinary singing skills, blending her tender vocals with the stirring piano and strings accompaniment. Singer/songwriter Kawae Minako was inspired by Mika's strong presence and wrote the song in a day. The first press of this single included a picture label disc (a picture on the CD).

Track listing

Charts
This single reached #5 on Oricon charts and charted for 14 weeks. It sold 105,631 units, making it the #97 single for 2005.

Total Reported Sales: 105,631*

2005 singles
Mika Nakashima songs